Ivy Log (or Ivylog) is a town in Union County, Georgia, United States. The original town centered on Casteel Mill at the mouth of Ivy Log Creek. Ivy Log is located along US 19/129/SR 11 at the east end of GA 325.

References

Towns in Georgia (U.S. state)
Unincorporated communities in Union County, Georgia
Unincorporated communities in Georgia (U.S. state)